Elliot John Bunney (born 11 December 1966 in Edinburgh, Midlothian) is a Scottish former athlete who competed mainly in the 100 metres. He competed for Scotland at the 1986, 1990, 1994 and 1998 Commonwealth Games, winning a bronze medal in the sprint relay team competition in 1986. He competed for Great Britain in the 1988 Summer Olympics and won a Silver medal as part of the sprint relay team.

Career
He won the AAA Junior championships in 1984 and 1985. He was also a Scottish 100-metre champion in 1985, 1986, 1989, 1991, 1992, and 1993. He won two Scottish 60-metre indoor titles in 1992 and 1993. In 1985 he became the first athlete to have won sprint titles in successive weeks at Scottish schools, junior and senior levels.

Elliot won two Gold medals competing for Great Britain at the 1985 European Athletics Junior Championships in Cottbus (at that time East Germany). He won the 100m (10.38sec - + 0.6) beating Endre Havas of Hungary with John Regis of Great Britain third. He was part of the winning 4 × 100 m relay team.

He was a AAAs Indoor 60-metre champion in 1987.

At the 1986 Commonwealth Games, competing for Scotland, he was a finalist in the 100 metres and finished 5th. He won a Bronze medal as part of the team that was third in the 4 x 100-metre relay.

He competed for Great Britain in the 1988 Summer Olympics held in Seoul, South Korea in the 4 x 100-metre relay where he won the silver medal with his teammates John Regis, Mike McFarlane and Linford Christie.

His personal best in the 100 metres was 10.20 seconds.

Elliot was coached throughout his career by Bob Inglis.

In 1994, he retired from top-level athletic competition aged 27 years old and played rugby for Scottish fourth division side Livingston RFC. and Heriots RFC. He also made a sevens appearance, playing for a Scottish select side at the Selkirk sevens.

References

 Elliot Bunney at the Gazetteer for Scotland

External links

1966 births
Living people
Athletes (track and field) at the 1986 Commonwealth Games
Athletes (track and field) at the 1988 Summer Olympics
Athletes (track and field) at the 1990 Commonwealth Games
Athletes (track and field) at the 1994 Commonwealth Games
Athletes (track and field) at the 1998 Commonwealth Games
British male sprinters
Commonwealth Games bronze medallists for Scotland
Commonwealth Games medallists in athletics
European Athletics Championships medalists
Heriot's RC players
Livingston RFC players
Medalists at the 1988 Summer Olympics
Olympic athletes of Great Britain
Olympic silver medalists in athletics (track and field)
Olympic silver medallists for Great Britain
Rugby union players from Edinburgh
Scottish male sprinters
Scottish Olympic medallists
Scottish rugby union players
Sportspeople from Edinburgh
Medallists at the 1986 Commonwealth Games